This is a list of casual vacancies in the Western Australian Legislative Council since 1989. Casual vacancies in the Legislative Council are filled by a countback of all votes.

References
 WA Electoral Commission - Past Elections

See also
 Members of the Western Australian Legislative Council

Western Australia
Legislative Council casual vacancies